Dandıx (also, Dandykh and Dandıq) is a village in the Qabala Rayon of Azerbaijan.  The village forms part of the municipality of Tikanlı.

References 

Populated places in Qabala District